Le Pont des Arts  is a 2004 French drama film directed by Eugène Green, starring Natacha Régnier.

Plot 
The story is of a young man who falls in love with and finds the whole meaning of his life contained in a young woman who sings a baroque lament on record. He discovers she committed suicide from the Pont des Arts, so that is the only way he can be with her too. The action unrolls in Paris between 1979 and 1980,

Cast
 Natacha Régnier - Sarah Dacruon
 Adrien Michaux - Pascal
 Alexis Loret - Manuel
 Jérémie Renier - Cédric
 Denis Podalydès - Guigui, l'Innomable
 Olivier Gourmet - J☆ean-Astolphe Méréville
Joséphine Bouvet Sandrine
 Robert Capovilla-  Tenore
 Pierre Samuel secondo  Tenore
 Xavier Clion Baritorno Basso

References

External links 

2004 films
2004 drama films
French drama films
2000s French films